Sujit Bose (26 June 1934 – 25 April 2015) was an Indian cricketer. He played eleven first-class matches for Bengal between 1957 and 1960.

See also
 List of Bengal cricketers

References

External links
 

1934 births
2015 deaths
Indian cricketers
Bengal cricketers
Sportspeople from Meerut